Joann Weiner is an associate professor of economics at George Washington University in the Columbian College of Arts and Sciences.

Education
Weiner earned a Bachelor of Science from the University of California, Berkeley. Weiner earned an M.A. and Ph.D. from Harvard University.

Work
Joann Weiner frequently has articles published in the Washington Post. She has also written for Bloomberg Government.

Joann Weiner is the director of the MS in Applied Economics program at The George Washington University.

References

George Washington University faculty
Living people
Harvard Graduate School of Arts and Sciences alumni
UC Berkeley College of Letters and Science alumni
Year of birth missing (living people)
American women economists